Heinrich Moos (27 March 1895 – 15 June 1976) was a German fencer. He competed in the individual and team sabre and team foil events at the 1928 Summer Olympics.

References

1895 births
1976 deaths
German male fencers
Olympic fencers of Germany
Fencers at the 1928 Summer Olympics
20th-century German people